Karlovačko live 2011. was a co-headlining concert tour by Croatian pop singer Jelena Rozga and Serbian rock band Bajaga i instruktori. The tour was embarked on 27 November 2011 in Split, Croatia at the Spaladium Arena, and concluded on 28 December of the same year in Pula, at the Mate Parlov Sport Centre.

Background
Karlovačko live is a common denomination for music projects related to the Karlovačko bear. The tradition of the project began in 2002 with Zucchero's concert in Pula. In 2004, Karlovačko live served as the debut for Miroslav Škoro and Prljavo kazalište. A year afterwards, Severina and Crvena jabuka were performing shows in 12 Croatian cities and in 2006, Karlovačko gathered three perfromers: Tony Cetinski, Saša Lošić and Gazde. In 2007, for the first time in Croatia, several performers from Bijelo dugme performed: Željko Bebek, Alen Islamović and Mladen Vojičić "Tifa", while the Karlovačko live tour of 2008 was given by Prljavo kazalište, the band which celebrated their 30th birthday at Karlovačko live. In 2009., the Karlovačko live tour was represented by Parni valjak and in 2010, Halid Bešlić and Crvenu jabuku.

Tour
The tour was announced during a press conference on 25 September 2010 in the Zagreb club called H2O. Entry tickets started being sold on 26 September as part of the band Eventim. As part of the tour, nine concerts were held in Croatia and one in Bosnia and Herzegovina.

Dates and locations

References

2011 concert tours
Concert tours of Europe